The 2018 Indy Lights season was the 33rd season of the Indy Lights open wheel motor racing series and the 17th sanctioned by IndyCar, acting as the primary support series for the IndyCar Series. A 17-race schedule was announced on October 17, 2017. 

Patricio O'Ward dueled the entire season with his Andretti Autosport teammate Colton Herta, ultimately clinching the title by winning the penultimate race of the season. O'Ward had nine wins with four other podium finishes while Herta captured four consecutive wins in the first half of the season, including the Freedom 100, but also finished second seven times. Belardi Auto Racing's Santiago Urrutia captured two race wins and finished third in the championship. Andretti's Ryan Norman and Juncos Racing's Victor Franzoni each had a single win and finished fourth and fifth in the championship respectively. There were only seven full-time entries. Andretti Autosport soundly won the team championship.

Team and driver chart

Schedule

Race results

Championship standings

Drivers' Championship

Scoring system

 The driver who qualified on pole was awarded one additional point.
 An additional point was awarded to the driver who led the most laps in a race.

Teams' championship
Scoring system

Single car teams receive 3 bonus points as an equivalency to multi-car teams

Only the best two results count for teams fielding more than two entries

See also
2018 IndyCar Series
2018 Pro Mazda Championship
2018 U.S. F2000 National Championship

References

External links 

 

Indy Lights seasons
Indy Lights
Indy Lights